Burn to Shine is an album by Ben Harper and the Innocent Criminals, released in 1999 on Virgin Records America. Harper's fourth album, it shows him working within many different genres, including blues, rock, soul, and folk. The songs "Steal My Kisses" and "Suzie Blue" became successful on college radio. Like most other Harper albums, different versions were released in different regions within varying bonus material.

Critical reception
The Washington Post wrote that "while the songs are seldom as interesting as the album's textured instrumental weave, Harper deserves credit for trying to break free of the cliches that have a stranglehold on the blues." Entertainment Weekly considered the album to be "mostly made up of leaden rootsy excursions." The Hartford Courant wrote that the album tackled "an overload of musical niches." Trouser Press called Harper "a thinking man’s Lenny Kravitz."

Track listing
All songs written by Ben Harper.
"Alone" – 3:58
"The Woman in You" – 5:41
"Less" – 4:05
"Two Hands of a Prayer" – 7:50
"Please Bleed" – 4:37
"Suzie Blue" – 4:29
"Steal My Kisses" – 4:05
"Burn to Shine" – 3:34
"Show Me a Little Shame" – 3:44
"Forgiven" – 5:17
"Beloved One" – 4:03
"In The Lord's Arms" – 3:06

Personnel
Ben Harper - guitar, vocals
Richard Barnes - washboard
Bruce Bishop - guitar
Jim Bogen - clarinet
Eve Butler - violin
Dean Butterworth - drums, snare drums
Jon Clarke - English horn, oboe
Joel Derouin - violin
Tyrone Downie - keyboards
Michael Fay - banjo
David Firman - bass
Matt Funes - viola
Suzie Katayama - cello
David Leach - percussion
James Leigh - trombone
David Lindley - banjo, fiddle, mandolin
Juan Nelson - bass
Real Time Jazz Band 
Nick Rich - human beatbox
Eric Sarafin - piano, harmonium, recorder

Production
Producer: J.P. Plunier
Engineers: Eric Sarafin, Dan Steinberg
Assistant engineer: Dan Steinberg
Mixing: Eric Sarafin
Mixing assistant: Steve Gamberoni, Geoff Walcha
Mastering: Dave Collins
String arrangements: Suzie Katayama
Art direction: J.P. Plunier
Design: Tom Dolan, Mike King, J.P. Plunier
Photography: Annalisa
Illustrations: Mike King
Research: Ben Elder

Charts
Album - Billboard (United States)

Singles - Billboard (United States)

Certifications

Notes 

Ben Harper albums
1999 albums
Virgin Records albums